Mount Lykaion (Lýkaion Óros) is a mountain in Arcadia, Greece. Lykaion has two peaks: Stefani to the north and St. Ilias (Agios Īlías) to the south where the altar of Zeus is located.

The northern peak is higher, 1,421 m, than the southern, 1,382 m. Mount Lykaion was sacred to Zeus Lykaios, who was said to have been born and brought up on it, and was the home of Pelasgus and his son Lycaon, who were said to have founded the ritual of Zeus practiced on its summit. This seems to have involved a human sacrifice and a feast in which the man who received the portion of a human victim was changed to a wolf, as Lycaon had been after sacrificing a child. The altar of Zeus consists of a great mound of ashes with a retaining wall. It was said that no shadows fell within the precincts and that any who entered it died within the year. The sanctuary of Zeus played host to athletic games held every four years, the Lykaia.

Archaeological excavations were first carried out in 1897 by K. Kontopoulos for the Greek Archaeological Service, followed by K. Kourouniotes between 1902 and 1909.

The Mt. Lykaion Excavation and Survey Project, a joint effort of the University of Pennsylvania and the University of Arizona began work at the site in 2004, with the aim of continuing the topographical survey begun in 1996 and carrying out a full topographical and architectural analysis not only of the altar and temenos, but of the nearby valley where the Lykaian Games were held. The detailed digital records and drawings of every architectural stone block. To date, a complete map of the area has been made, including not only the Ash Altar and temenos, but also two fountains, including the Hagno fountain mentioned by Pausanias, the hippodrome, the stadium, a building that was probably a bathhouse, the xenon (hotel), a stoa, several rows of seats, and a group of statue bases.

Many of these buildings seem to have been planned in relation to each other: the baths at the northern end of the hippodrome are on the same alignment as it is, and the stoa, the xenon, the lower fountain, and the rows of seats all appear to have been built in an intentionally similar alignment. Just to the north of the stoa four rows of seats were excavated, with the remains of a group of stelae and statue bases nearby. These would have bordered the hippodrome's southern edge, and correspond to an earlier excavated row of seats on the south-eastern edge of the racetrack. The majority of the spectators of events in the hippodrome, however, would have sat on the surrounding hills.

In the literary record

Mt. Lykaion, its religious significance, and its quadrennial athletic games appear with some frequency in the ancient literary sources. The 2nd-century Greek geographer Pausanias provides the greatest amount of information in the eighth book of his Description of Greece, where he discusses Lykaion's mythological, historical, and physical characteristics in detail. More isolated references occur, however, in sources ranging from Plato to Virgil.

Legendary period

Pausanias states that the Arcadians claimed Cretea atop Mt. Lykaion as the birthplace of Zeus, although tradition had handed down at least two other locations for Zeus’ birth.

Lycaon, son of Pelasgus, the mythical founder of the Greek race, is said to have instituted the worship of Zeus at Mt. Lykaion, giving the god the epithet Lykaios and establishing games in his honor. The Bibliotheca, a Roman-era mythological compendium, adds the story that Lycaon attempted to test Zeus’ omniscience by tricking him into eating a sacrifice mixed with human flesh. In punishment, Zeus slew Lycaon and his fifty sons. Other sources, including the Roman poet Ovid, claim instead that Lycaon's punishment was transformation into a wolf, an early example of lycanthropy.

Historical events

According to Pausanias and the Greek historian Polybius, an inscribed pillar (stele) was erected near the altar of Zeus on Mt. Lykaion during the Second Messenian War, a revolt against the Spartans. The inscription supposedly commemorated the execution of Aristocrates of Arcadia, who had betrayed the Messenian hero Aristomenes at the battle of the Great Trench.

Thucydides, a Greek historian of the Peloponnesian War, writes that the Spartan king Pleistoanax lived on Mt. Lykaion while in exile from the mid-440s BC until 427, where he built a house straddling the sacred region (temenos) of Zeus to avoid further persecution.

In his Stratagems, the 2nd-century Macedonian rhetorician Polyaenus describes a battle between the Spartans and Demetrius of Macedon in 294 BC. Mt. Lykaion extended between the camps of the two sides, causing some consternation among the Macedonians due to their unfamiliarity with the terrain. Nevertheless, Demetrius’ forces won the battle with relative ease.

Polybius and Plutarch, a Greek author writing under the Roman empire, cite a battle at Mt. Lykaion in 227 BC between the Achaean League under Aratus and the Spartans under Cleomenes III. Although the details are vague, both authors make it clear that the Achaeans were defeated and that Aratus was believed (mistakenly) to have been killed.

Religious worship

Pan

Mt. Lykaion was an important site of religious worship in ancient Greece. Pausanias describes a sanctuary of Pan surrounded by a grove of trees. At the sanctuary were bases of statues, which by Pausanias’ time had been deprived of the statues themselves, as well as a hippodrome, where the athletic games had once been held. References to Lykaian Pan are especially abundant in Latin poetry, as for instance in Virgil's epic, the Aeneid: “Lupercal / Parrhasio dictum Panos de more Lycaei,” “...the Lupercal, named after the Parrhasian worship of Lykaian Pan,” and in Horace's Odes: “Velox amoenum saepe Lucretilem / mutat Lycaeo Faunus,” “Often swift Faunus [Pan] exchanges Lykaion for pleasant Lucretilis.”

Zeus Lykaios

Pausanias records the presence of a mound of earth on the highest point of the mountain, an altar to Zeus Lykaios. He describes two pillars near the altar which had once been topped by golden eagles. Although Pausanias alludes to secret sacrifices which took place on this altar, he explains that he was reluctant to inquire into these rites due to their extreme antiquity. Pausanias also discusses the temenos of Zeus, a sacred precinct which humans were forbidden to enter. He notes the common belief that any person entering the temenos would die within a year, along with the legend that all creatures, human and animal alike, cast no shadow while inside the sacred area.

Games

The athletic competitions at Lykaion, held every four years, receive occasional mention in the literary record. Authors are in disagreement as to when exactly the games were first instituted: Aristotle is said to have ranked the Lykaion games fourth in order of institution after the Eleusinia, the Panathenaia, and the Argive games, while Pausanias argues for the Lykaian competition's priority to the Panathenaia. Pliny the Elder, an imperial Roman polymath, states that the games at Lykaion were the first to introduce gymnastic competition. The ancient Greek lyric poet Pindar records the victories of several athletes in his Victory Odes, and two inscribed stelae recently excavated from the Lykaian hippodrome provide information about the events, participants, and winners at the games.

Modern study

After 1832, when Greece had gained independence from the Ottoman Empire, European travelers and scholars began to systematically tour Sparta and the Peloponnese. Ernst Curtius, Charles Beulé, and Guillaume Blouet published scholarly studies of the area, and discussions of the region appeared in German and British travelogues as well. Many of these writers used Pausanias as their guide to the geography and sights of the region, but were also concerned to correlate modern Greek place-names with ancient evidence.

Beulé described the hippodrome and surrounding area, including large stones that he assumed formed had formed the seats of the judges and magistrates, and the remains of a building he called a temple to Pan, but which probably corresponds to the stoa of the modern excavations. The German writer Ross described the bathhouse and its ancient but still-visible cisterns, which site he noted the locals called the Skaphidia.

Mt. Lykaion was initially excavated by the Greek Archaeological Service, first in 1897 by archaeologist K. Kontopoulos and again in 1902 by K. Kourouniotes. Kontopoulos dug several trial trenches near the hippodrome and the altar. Kourouniotes's excavations of the altar and surrounding area (the temenos) were particularly informative; he learned that the altar consisted of a raised mound of blackened earth as described by Pausanias. Excavation of the earth of the altar yielded burnt stones, small animal (cow and pig) bones, tiny pottery fragments, iron knives, clay figures, coins from Aegina, a clay figure of a bird, and two small bronze tripods. Further trenches dug in the temenos produced several bronze figures, some iron objects, and roof tiles. In 1909 Kourouniotes excavated an area at the east of the mountain and beneath the summit, the site of the hippodrome, stadium, and bathhouse.

Since Kourouniotes's excavation, anthropologists and scholars of Arcadian religion have studied the site in terms of its development as a sanctuary, but there was no further systematic or scientific investigation until 1996, when Dr. David Gilman Romano of the University of Pennsylvania conducted a topographical and architectural survey of the site. Romano continued his work with the Mt. Lykaion Excavation and Survey Project under the auspices of the University of Pennsylvania and the University of Arizona. A preliminary planning phase of cleaning and surveying took place in 2004 and 2005, and was followed by a five-year excavation program beginning in June 2006. A two-year period during which the findings will be studied is scheduled to begin in the summer of 2011.

Hippodrome 

The hippodrome at Mount Lykaion, located in a valley below and to the north of the altar, is the only extant hippodrome from Greek antiquity, and is therefore crucial to our understanding of Greek athletic festivals. The hippodrome was constructed on roughly a north-south orientation with a retaining wall of about 140 meters along the eastern side curving around the northern end. Modern excavations have discovered portions tapering column drums that may belonged to the turning posts at either end of the race-course, from whose location it appears that the hippodrome could have had a length of 320 meters and a width of 140. A bath building is being excavated about 35 meters to the northeast of the hippodrome; a large portion of it appears to have been dedicated to a cistern, and large stone basins from the middle of the structure have been uncovered

The Lykaian hippodrome is further unique in apparently having encompassed the stadium racecourse. The early 20th century excavator of Lykaion, Kouriouniotis discovered stone blocks in the middle of the hippodrome that would have formed the starting line of the stadium. The topological survey of 1996 confirmed 6 starting line blocks, four of which were grouped together and were thus possibly found near their original orientation and position. From this, archaeologist David Romano speculated that a stadium racecourse of 170–180 meters would have been enclosed within the hippodrome. The apparently double-use of the space is particularly interesting because inscriptional evidence concerning the Lykaian Games of the 4th century BCE indicates that horse and foot-races were held during the same festivals, and possibly on the same day.

Two inscriptions were uncovered in the excavations of Kouriouniotis that give the names of winning athletes in the various contests of the Lykaian Games that were held every four years between 320 and 304 BCE. These contests included footraces for men and for boys, various chariot races with teams of adult and juvenile horses, boxing, wrestling, and a pentathlon.

Ash altar 

A circular altar of blackened earth about 1.5 meters in height and 30 meters in diameter seems to date from before the migration of Indo-European peoples into the area. The excavations of Kourouniotes in 1903 of the altar and its nearby temenos determined definite cult activity at the Lykaion altar from the late 7th century b.c.e, including animals bones, miniature tripods, knives, and statuettes of Zeus holding an eagle and a lightning bolt. These objects were primarily found in the temenos. The earth-altar may correspond to a Linear B mention of an "open-fire altar"; Linear B (14th–13th centuries BCE) inscriptions also give the first mentions of offerings to Zeus and of the sacred precinct (temenos) near the altar, such as has been excavated at Lykaion.

Excavation in 2007 revealed pottery fragments and signs of activity in the ash altar believed to have been used as early as 3000 BCE. Nearby Olympia (only 22 miles away) has a similar ash altar, and both settlements held ancient athletic games. The extremely early date of activity at Lykaion could suggest that these customs originated there. Stratigraphic analysis from the most recent excavations showed prehistoric human activity at the altar site, which seems to have been in continuous use from the Late Neolithic period through to the Hellenistic era. A number of drinking vessels and bones of sheep and goats from the Late Helladic period indicates that the altar was the site of Mycenean drinking and feasting rituals, probably in honor of Zeus. An especially interesting discovery was a seal ring from the Late Minoan period (1500–1400 BCE), which could indicate some interaction between Mt. Lykaion and Crete, both of which are given as the birthplace of Zeus by ancient sources.

Recent excavations of a 30-meter ash altar on Mount Lykaion in Greece, once worshipped as the birthplace of Zeus, have revealed a 3000-year-old skeleton of an adolescent boy thought to be a human sacrifice, The Boston Globe reports. The altar is not a cemetery, the researchers note, and the skeleton was lined with stones, showing that it was not a typical human burial. Plato and other ancient writers linked Mount Lykaion specifically to human sacrifices to Zeus—the legends say a sacrificed boy would be cooked with sacrificed animal meat and those who consumed the  human  portion would become a wolf for 9 years.

Notes and references

External links

Lykaion Excavation and Survey Project

Landforms of Arcadia, Peloponnese
Ancient Greek archaeological sites in Peloponnese (region)
Ancient Greek geography
Ancient Greek religion
Arcadian mythology
Lykaion
Locations in Greek mythology
Human sacrifice
Mountains of Peloponnese (region)